Guru Tegh Bahadur (Punjabi: ਗੁਰੂ ਤੇਗ਼ ਬਹਾਦਰ (Gurmukhi); ; 1 April 1621 – 11 November 1675) was the ninth of ten Gurus who founded the Sikh religion and the leader of Sikhs from 1665 until his beheading in 1675. He was born in Amritsar, Punjab, India in 1621 and was the youngest son of Guru Hargobind, the sixth Sikh guru. Considered a principled and fearless warrior, he was a learned spiritual scholar and a poet whose 115 hymns are included in Sri Guru Granth Sahib, the main text of Sikhism.

Guru Tegh Bahadur was executed on the orders of Aurangzeb, the sixth Mughal emperor, in Delhi, India. Sikh holy premises Gurudwara Sis Ganj Sahib and Gurdwara Rakab Ganj Sahib in Delhi mark the places of execution and cremation of Guru Tegh Bahadur. His martyrdom is remembered as the Shaheedi Divas of Guru Tegh Bahadur every year on 24 November.

Biography

Early life
Guru Tegh Bahadur was the youngest son of Guru Hargobind, the sixth guru: Guru Hargobind had one daughter, Bibi Viro, and five sons: Baba Gurditta, Suraj Mal, Ani Rai, Atal Rai, and Tyaga Mal. Tyaga Mal was born in Amritsar in the early hours of 1 April 1621. He came to be known by the name Tegh Bahadur (Mighty of the Sword), given to him by Guru Hargobind after he had shown his valor in a battle against the Mughals.

Amritsar at that time was the center of the Sikh faith. As the seat of the Sikh Gurus, and with its connection to Sikhs in far-flung areas of the country through the chains of Masands or missionaries, it had developed the characteristics of a State capital.

Guru Tegh Bahadur was brought up in the Sikh culture and trained in archery and horsemanship. He was also taught the old classics such as the Vedas, the Upanishads, and the Puranas. Tegh Bahadur was married on 3 February 1632 to Mata Gujri.

Stay at Bakala 
In the 1640s, nearing his death, Guru Hargobind and his wife Nanaki moved to his ancestral village of Bakala in Amritsar district, together with Tegh Bahadur and Mata Gujri. Bakala, as described in Gurbilas Dasvin Patshahi, was then a prosperous town with many beautiful pools, wells, and baolis. After Guru Hargobind's death, Tegh Bahadur continued to live in Bakala with his wife and mother.

Guru journey
In March 1664, Guru Har Krishan contracted smallpox. When asked by his followers who would lead them after him, he replied Baba Bakala, meaning his successor was to be found in Bakala. Taking advantage of the ambiguity in the words of the dying Guru, many installed themselves in Bakala, claiming themselves as the new Guru. Sikhs were puzzled to see so many claimants.

Sikh tradition has a myth concerning the manner in which Tegh Bahadur was selected as the ninth guru. A wealthy trader, Baba Makhan Shah Labana, had once prayed for his life and had promised to gift 500 gold coins to the Sikh Guru if he survived. He arrived in search of the ninth Guru. He went from one claimant to the next making his obeisance and offering two gold coins to each Guru, believing that the right guru would know that his silent promise was to gift 500 coins for his safety. Every "guru" he met accepted the two gold coins and bid him farewell. Then he discovered that Tegh Bahadur also lived at Bakala. Labana gifted Tegh Bahadur the usual offering of two gold coins. Tegh Bahadur gave him his blessings and remarked that his offering was considerably short of the promised five hundred. Makhan Shah Labana forthwith made good the difference and ran upstairs. He began shouting from the rooftop, "Guru ladho re, Guru ladho re" meaning "I have found the Guru, I have found the Guru".

In August 1664, a Sikh Sangat arrived in Bakala and appointed Tegh Bahadur as the ninth guru of Sikhs. The Sangat was led by Diwan Durga Mal,], elder brother of Guru Tegh Bahadur, conferring Guruship on Him.

As had been the custom among Sikhs after the execution of Guru Arjan by Mughal Emperor Jahangir, Guru Tegh Bahadur was surrounded by armed bodyguards. He himself lived an austere life.

Works
Guru Tegh Bahadur contributed many hymns to Granth Sahib including the Shloks, or couplets near the end of the Guru Granth Sahib. Guru Tegh Bahadur toured various parts of the Mughal Empire and was asked by Gobind Sahali to construct several Sikh temples in Mahali. His works include 116 shabads, and 15 ragas, and his bhagats are credited with 782 compositions that are part of bani in Sikhism. His works are included in the Guru Granth Sahib (pages 219–1427). They cover a wide range of topics, such as the nature of God, human attachments, body, mind, sorrow, dignity, service, death, and deliverance.

Journeys
Guru Tegh Bahadur traveled extensively in different parts of the country, including Dhaka and Assam, to preach the teachings of Nanak, the first Sikh guru. The places he visited and stayed in became sites of Sikh temples. During his travels, Guru Tegh Bahadur spread the Sikh ideas and message, as well as started community water wells and langars (community kitchen charity for the poor).

The Guru made three successive visits to Kiratpur. On 21 August 1664, Guru Tegh Bahadur went there to console Bibi Roop upon the death of her father, Guru Har Rai, the seventh Sikh guru, and of his brother, Guru Har Krishan. The second visit was on 15 October 1664, at the death on 29 September 1664, of Bassi, the mother of Guru Har Rai. A third visit concluded a fairly extensive journey through the northwest Indian subcontinent. His son Guru Gobind Singh, who would be the tenth Sikh Guru, was born in Patna, while he was away in Dhubri, Assam in 1666, where stands the Gurdwara Sri Guru Tegh Bahadur Sahib. There he helped end the war between Raja Ram Singh of Bengal and Raja Chakardwaj of Ahom state (later Assam). He visited the towns of Mathura, Agra, Allahabad and Varanasi.

After his visit to Assam, Bengal, and Bihar, the Guru visited Rani Champa of Bilaspur who offered to give the Guru a piece of land in her state. The Guru bought the site for 500 rupees. There, Guru Tegh Bahadur founded the city of Anandpur Sahib in the foothills of the Himalayas. In 1672, Tegh Bahadur traveled through Kashmir and the North-West Frontier, to meet the masses, as the persecution of non-Muslims reached new heights.

Execution

The primary nucleus of Sikh narratives remains the Bachittar Natak, a memoir of Guru Gobind Singh, Guru Tegh Bahadur's son, dated between late 1680s and late 1690s. 
Guru Tegh Bahadur's son and successor recalled Guru's execution:

More Sikh accounts of Guru Tegh Bahadur's execution, all claiming to be sourced from the "testimony of trustworthy Sikhs", only started emerging in around the late eighteenth century, and are thus, often conflicting. Chronicler Sohan Lal Suri states that the Guru gained thousands of followers of soldiers and horsemen during his travels between 1672 and 1673 in southern Punjab and provided shelter to those who were resistant to Mughal representatives. Aurangzeb was warned about such activity, as a cause of concern that could possibly lead to rebellion.

Persian sources maintain that the Guru was a bandit whose plunder and rapine of Punjab along with his rebellious activities precipitated his execution. The earliest Persian source to chronicle his execution is Siyar-ul-Mutakhkherin by Ghulam Hussain Khan c. 1782, where Tegh Bahadur's (alleged) oppression of subjects is held to have incurred Aurangzeb's wrath:

Satish Chandra however cautions against taking Hussain Khan's argument at face value. He was a relative of Alivardi Khan — one of the closest confidantes of Aurangzeb — and might have been providing an "official justification". There are other challenges to the above narrative. Ghulam Husain lived far away from Punjab. Also, the Guru's association with Hafiz Adam is anachronistic. Hafiz Adam died in Medina in A.D. 1643, 21 years before Guru Tegh Bahadur attained the status of Guru. Further, it should be pointed out that according to Ghulam Husain, Guru Tegh Bahadur was confined in Gwalior, where, under imperial orders, his body was "cut into four quarters" and hung at the four gates of the fortress while it is well-known that Guru Tegh Bahadur was executed in Delhi where the Sisganj Gurudwara is situated at present. The Sikh sakhis written during the eighteenth century indirectly support the narrative in the Persian sources; nothing that the Guru was in "violent opposition to the Muslim rulers of the country" in response to the dogmatic policies implemented by Aurangzeb. Both Persian and Sikh sources agree that Guru Tegh Bahadur militarily opposed the Mughal state and was therefore targeted for execution in accordance with Aurangzeb's zeal for punishing enemies of the state.

Many scholars identify the narrative as follows: A congregation of Hindu Pandits from Kashmir requested help against Aurangzeb's oppressive policies, to which Guru Tegh Bahadur decided to protect their rights. Guru Tegh Bahadur left from his base at Makhowal to confront the persecution of Kashmiri Brahmins by Mughal officials but was arrested at Ropar and put to jail in Sirhind. Four months later, in November 1675, he was transferred to Delhi and asked to perform a miracle to prove his nearness to God or convert to Islam. The Guru declined and three of his colleagues, who had been arrested with him, were tortured to death in front of him: Bhai Mati Das was sawn into pieces, Bhai Dayal Das was thrown into a cauldron of boiling water, and Bhai Sati Das was burned alive. Thereafter, Tegh Bahadur was publicly beheaded in Chandni Chowk, a market square close to the Red Fort.

Satish Chandra expresses doubt about the authenticity of these meta-narratives, centered on miracles — Aurangzeb was not a believer in them. He further expresses doubt pertaining to the narrative of the persecution of Hindus in Kashmir within Sikh accounts, remarking that no contemporary sources mentioned the persecution of Hindus there. Louis Fenech refuses to pass any judgement, in light of the paucity of primary sources; however, he notes that these Sikh accounts had coded martyrdom into the events, with an aim to elicit pride than trauma in readers. He further argues that Tegh Bahadur had sacrificed himself for the sake of his own faith;  the janju and tilak in the passage in the Bachittar Natak referring to his own.

Remarkably, in contrast to this dominating theme in Sikh literature, some pre-modern Sikh accounts had laid the blame on an acrimonious succession dispute: Ram Rai, elder brother of Guru Har Krishan, was held to have instigated Aurangzeb against Tegh Bahadur by suggesting that he prove his spiritual greatness by performing miracles at the Court. Sohan Lal Suri, the court historian of Ranjit Singh, in his magisterial Umdat ut Tawarikh (c. 1805) chose to reiterate Hussain Khan's argument at large: Tegh Bahadur had provided refuge to all classes of rebels and commanded a huge nomadic army across Punjab; so he was put down at the earliest, lest he declares an insurrection in near future.

Guru Tegh Bahadur's Martyrdom Day 

Every year November 24 is observed as the day of the Martyrdom of Guru Tegh Bahadur. On this day in 1675, he was publicly Executed by the Mughal Emperor Aurangzeb in Delhi for refusing to accept Aurangzeb's authority. The sites of his death and cremation were converted into sacred sites and are now known as Gurudwara Sis Ganj Sahib and Gurudwara Rakab Ganj Sahib in Delhi, respectively. Apart from the Contributions made by Guru Tegh Bahadur Ji to uphold the Pride of the Indian community before the Mughals, he also made his Contribution to the Holy Guru Granth Sahib. In total, there are 115 hymns including the slokas of Guru Tegh Bahadur Ji at the end of the Holy Book. In all his works he tried to explain the nature of God, human attachments, sorrow, mind, life, and death, etc.

Legacy and memorials

Guru Har Gobind was Guru Tegh Bahadur's father. He was originally named Tyag Mal (Tīāg Mal) but was later renamed Tegh Bahadur after his gallantry and bravery in the wars against the Mughal forces. He built the city of Anandpur Sahib and was responsible for saving a faction of Kashmiri Pandits, who were being persecuted by the Mughals.

After the execution of Tegh Bahadur by Mughal Emperor Aurangzeb, a number of Sikh temples were built in his and his associates' memory. The Gurdwara Sis Ganj Sahib in Chandni Chowk, Delhi, was built over where he was beheaded. Gurdwara Rakab Ganj Sahib, also in Delhi, is built on the site of the residence of a disciple of Tegh Bahadur, who burned his house to cremate his master's body.

Gurdwara Sisganj Sahib in Punjab marks the site where in November 1675, the head of the martyred Guru Tegh Bahadar which was brought by Bhai Jaita (renamed Bhai Jiwan Singh according to Sikh rites) in defiance of the Mughal authority of Aurangzeb was cremated here. During his journey to Anandpur Sahib Bhai Jaita Singh reach a village near Delhi in Sonipat and the Mughal army also reach that village. Bhai Jaita demand for help to villagers so the villagers hideout Bhai Jaita with Guru' head. A villager named Kushal Singh Dahiya came ahead and offers his own head in the place of Guru's head to Mughal army. After beheading Kushal Singh Dahiya the villagers shuffle the heads and give the head of Kushal Singh Dahiya to Mughal army.

Tegh Bahadur has been remembered for giving up his life for the freedom of religion, reminding Sikhs and non-Muslims in India to follow and practice their beliefs. Guru Tegh Bahadur was martyred, along with fellow devotees Bhai Mati Dass, Bhai Sati Das and Bhai Dayala. 24 November, the date of his martyrdom, is observed in certain parts of India as a public holiday.

The execution hardened the resolve of Sikhs against Muslim rule and persecution. Pashaura Singh states that "if the martyrdom of Guru Arjan had helped bring the Sikh Panth together, Guru Tegh Bahadur's martyrdom helped to make the protection of human rights central to its Sikh identity". Wilfred Smith stated "the attempt to forcibly convert the ninth Guru to an externalized, impersonal Islam clearly made an indelible impression on the martyr's nine-year-old son, Gobind, who reacted slowly but deliberately by eventually organizing the Sikh group into a distinct, formal, symbol-patterned community". It inaugurated the Khalsa identity.

In one of his poetic works, the classical Punjabi poet Bulleh Shah, referred Tegh Bahadur as "Ghazi", an honorific title for a warrior.

Gallery

Notes

References

External links

Peer reviewed publications on Guru Tegh Bahadur
Guru Tegh Bahadur Ranbir Singh (1975)
Non-Canonical Compositions Attributed to the Seventh and Ninth Sikh Gurus, Jeevan Singh Deol, Journal of the American Oriental Society, 121(2): 193–203, (Apr. – Jun., 2001)

1621 births
1675 deaths
Tegh
People executed for refusing to convert to Islam
Executed Indian people
People executed by the Mughal Empire
17th-century executions in India
Punjabi people
People executed by India by decapitation
Indian city founders
Sikh martyrs